Raver is a city and municipal council in Jalgaon district in the Indian state of Maharashtra. It is the administrative center of Raver Taluka. Raver is famous for the Bhagvan Dattatreya-temple which is 200 years old and was founded by Sachidanand Swami Maharaj. Built in the old Mughal Kaleen tradition, it also has some ancient photos of Bhagvan Dattreyay in form of Malaang Fakir, Bhagwan Dattreyay's Charan Paduka. It is part of the Khandesh region.

Economy
The economy of the city is mainly dependent on agriculture and related businesses. Raver Taluka is an important market for bananas in the state of Maharashtra and India. It contributes to about more than 80% of production in Jalgaon district.

Geography
Raver is located in North Maharashtra Region.

Transport

Roads
The town is connected to its district headquarters, Jalgaon, by road. The Ankleshwar-Burhanpur National Highway (previously SH4) runs through the city. It connects Raver to Burhanpur in Madhya Pradesh & Ankaleshwar in Gujarat. This highway has caused Savda and neighbouring villages to become an important banana transportation hub. Due to increasing traffic, the road was converted into a national highway. The town is also well-connected to other villages through major roads.

Rail
Railways connect the city to Mumbai and Delhi. The Raver Railway station is located on the Major Bhusawal-Khandwa line of the Bhusawal Division of Central Railway. 60 to 70 trains run through this line daily, of which only 10 to 12 stop at this station.

Air
The nearby airports are Jalgaon, Aurangabad, and Devi Ahilya Bai Holkar Airport (Indore).

Demographics
 India census, Raver has a population of 27,039. Males constitute 52% of the population and females 48%. Raver has an average literacy rate of 65%, higher than the national average of 59.5%: male literacy is 72%, and female literacy is 58%. 15% of the population is under 6 years of age. Raver has a mixed population of all castes including Hindus and Muslims. The Adivasi people living in the Satpura Hills include Tadvi (Bhilla), Pawara, Bhilala, and Pardhi.

Politics

Raver Lok Sabha constituency 
Raver Lok Sabha constituency is one of the 48 Lok Sabha (lower house of Indian parliament) constituencies of Maharashtra state in western India. This constituency was created on 19 February 2008 as a part of the implementation of the Presidential notification based on the recommendations of the Delimitation Commission of India constituted on 12 July 2002. It first held elections in 2009 and its first member of parliament (MP) was Haribhau Jawale of the Bharatiya Janata Party (BJP). As of the 2014 elections, the current MP is Raksha Khadase, also of the BJP.

Raver Vidhan Sabha Constituency 

Raver Vidhan Sabha constituency is one of the 288 Vidhan Sabha (Legislative Assembly) constituencies of Maharashtra state in western India. This constituency comprises the Raver and Yaval taluka of Jalgaon district.

Education

Sardar G. G. High School and Junior College
Raver Parisar Shikshan Prasarak Mandal's Shri. Vitthalrao Shankarao Naik Arts, and Commerce and Science College
Macro Vision Academy School
Sardar G.G. High School & Jr. College
K.S.A. Girls High School
Yashwant Vidyalaya
Anglo Urdu High School
Nagarpalika schools
Modern English Medium School
Saraswati Vidya Mandir
Swami Vivekanand school
Akole High School
Macro Vision Academy School (CBSE-affiliated)
V.S. Naik College oF Arts, Commerce & Science
Govt. I.T.I. College
Kids Wonder A Play School
Shri Swami Samarth Mahila 
Mahavidyalaya
Shikshanshastra Mahila College
Swami English medium school

See also
Karjod

References

Cities and towns in Jalgaon district
Talukas in Maharashtra